This is the full table of the medal table of the 1988 Summer Olympics held in Seoul.

These rankings sort by the number of gold medals earned by a country. The number of silvers is taken into consideration next and then the number of bronze. If, after the above, countries are still tied, equal ranking is given and they are listed alphabetically. This follows the system used by the IOC, IAAF and BBC.

Athletes from 52 countries won medals, leaving 108 countries without a medal. The Soviet Union utterly dominated the medal count, winning 55 gold and 132 total medals. The results that got closest to that medal haul afterwards are China's 48 gold medals in 2008 and the USA's 121 total medals in 2016.

Medals table

Change By Doping

References

External links
 
 
 

Medal count
1988